Erkmen is a Turkish surname. Notable people with the surname include:

Ayşe Erkmen (born 1949), Turkish artist
Hayrettin Erkmen (1915–1999), Turkish politician
Hüseyin Erkmen (1915–?), Turkish sport wrestler
Muhlis Erkmen (1891–1985), Turkish farmer and politician
Nizamettin Erkmen (1919–1990), Turkish politician

Erkmen may also refer to the town Erkmen, Afyonkarahisar.

Turkish-language surnames